Ronald Phillips may refer to:

 Ron Phillips (politician) (born 1949), Australian politician
 Ron Phillips (Australian footballer) (1921–2007), Australian rules footballer
 Ronald L. Phillips (born 1940), American scientist and professor
 Ronnie Phillips (1947–2002), British footballer
 Ronald C. Phillips (1932–2005), American marine botanist and educator
 Ronald Phillips (murderer) (1973–2017), American murderer executed in 2017